ASW, a three-letter abbreviation, may refer to:
 an Associate Clinical Social Worker (ASW) in the state of California
High-temperature insulation wool#alumino silicate wool
Asynchronous SpaceWarp, a framerate smoothing technique used on the Oculus Rift
Anti-submarine warfare
Artificial seawater
Aswan International Airport, Egypt, IATA code
aSmallWorld, an online social network service
American School of Warsaw, Poland.
Amalgamated Society of Woodworkers, former UK trades union
Arc System Works, a video game development company
Avengers: Secret Wars, an upcoming film produced by Marvel Studios

Sports
All-Star Wrestling, a former professional wrestling promotion based in Vancouver, Canada
All Star Wrestling, a professional wrestling promotion based in Liverpool, England
Altijd Sterker Worden, a club from Dordrecht, Netherlands that merged into SC Emma
Altijd Sterker Worden, a club from Hendrik-Ido-Ambacht, Netherlands under its original name